Ray "Chico" Hopkins (born 8 July 1946) is a Welsh international rugby player who was also a member of the British Lions.

Background
Ray Hopkins was born in Maesteg, Wales, and he later worked as a National Coal Board fitter at their workshop in Maesteg.

Club career

Hopkins played youth rugby union for the Maesteg RFC academy. Later, he played for the senior Maesteg team, British and Irish Lions and Llanelli RFC.

Hopkins played for the victorious Llanelli team that played and beat the New Zealand All Blacks at Stradey Park on 31 October 1972. The Scarlets side emerged 9-3 winners of what was a bruising, brutal encounter at a packed Stradey Park with 20,000 supporters. Others to play in the victory included ex Wales Coach Gareth Jenkins and Ray Gravell.

In 1972 Hopkins joined Swinton RLFC (rugby league), making his debut against Huyton on 3 December that year.

International career

Although he played only 20 minutes for the full international Wales team, Hopkins earned lasting fame in Welsh rugby history due to a notable try against England in 1970. It was unfortunate for him that Gareth Edwards was in possession of the Wales and British Lions scrum-half position at the time.

Hopkins's moment of fame came during the England v. Wales game at Twickenham in 1970. The Wales team were behind on points with twenty minutes to go. The captain, Gareth Edwards, was injured and had to retire from the game. Hopkins came onto the field as a replacement. He soon scored a try, and, after a conversion by J.P.R. Williams, Wales won the game.

He toured with the 1971 Lions to New Zealand and played in ten games against provincial sides. He was an injury replacement for Gareth Edwards in the Dunedin Test match, which the Lions won, 9-3.

References

1946 births
Living people
Barbarian F.C. players
British & Irish Lions rugby union players from Wales
Llanelli RFC players
Maesteg RFC players
Rugby league players from Maesteg
Rugby union players from Maesteg
Rugby union scrum-halves
Swinton Lions players
Wales international rugby union players
Welsh rugby league players
Welsh rugby union players